Coliseo Bicentenario Alejandro Galvis Ramírez, mostly known as Coliseo Bicentenario is an indoor sporting arena, located in Bucaramanga, Colombia. The stadium was built in 2011 for the AMF Futsal Men's World Cup and is part of the Villa Olímpica Alfonso López (Alfonso López Olympic Village), which is also composed by the Alfonso López stadium. The capacity of the stadium is for 7,000 spectators. Coliseo Bicentenario is currently used by futsal team Real Bucaramanga and was used previously by the  now-defunct team Bucaramanga FSC. The stadium hosted the 2012 FIRS Senior Men's Inline Hockey World Championships. and 
was one of the three stadiums that hosted the 2016 FIFA Futsal World Cup.

See also
Estadio Alfonso López

References

Indoor arenas in Colombia
Santander Department
Sports venues completed in 2011